Report of the committee appointed to investigate phenomena connected with the Theosophical Society, commonly called the Hodgson Report was an 1885 report by the Society for Psychical Research (SPR) on Helena Blavatsky and purportedly apported Mahatma Letters.

History
Richard Hodgson, a member of the SPR and a research worker of paranormal phenomena, was sent to India. Hodgson's task was to examine if the mode of appearance attributed to the Mahatma Letters represented genuine psychical phenomena. In December 1884 Hodgson arrived in Adyar. He eventually concluded that the evidence supported Emma Coulomb, and that various inconsistencies, misrepresentations, and provable falsehoods in sworn statements by certain Theosophical Society members destroyed their credibility. He included in his research examination of the physical spaces where phenomena had been reported, including architectural features that had been concealed or removed from their original placements. Hodgson wrote a 200-page report, in which Blavatsky was described "as one of the most accomplished, ingenious, and interesting impostors in history."

The report considers at length if letters from Blavatsky provided by the Coulombs as evidence for fraudulent activity were genuinely from her hand, the consistency and credibility of various people who claimed to have witnessed psychic phenomena that occurred through Blavatsky, possible methods by which many purported phenomena might have been humanly produced, and references to various accounts of these phenomena as they had been published or circulated in public knowledge. The Hodgson report is detailed and contains extensive appendices.

Blavatsky's reputation was seriously damaged due to the Hodgson Report, and she wrote on 14 January 1886: "That Mr. Hodgson's elaborate but misdirected inquiries, his affected precision, which spends infinite patience over trifles and is blind to facts of importance, his contradictory reasoning and his manifold incapacity to deal with such problems as those he endeavoured to solve, will be exposed by other writers in due course – I make no doubt."

Vernon Harrison's examination of the Hodgson Report 
In 1986, Vernon Harrison, a researcher of paranormal phenomena and member of the Society for Psychical Research (SPR), attempted to undermine the accuracy of the Hodgson Report. According to Harrison, the Hodgson Report is not a scientific study, it "is flawed and untrustworthy" and "should be read with great caution, if not disregarded." Harrison blamed the SPR committee "for publishing this thoroughly bad report" without a fact checked critical reading of it and "the quondam Council of the Theosophical Society for their failure to allow their founder fair defense." Harrison concluded that the report's "errors of procedure, its inconsistencies, its faulty reasoning and bias, its hostility towards the subject and its contempt for the 'native' and other witnesses, would have become apparent; and the case would have been referred back for further study." Since Blavatsky "was the most important occultist ever" investigated by the SPR, the process was a wasted opportunity.

Harrison accused Hodgson of selection bias and wrote that "whereas Hodgson was prepared to use any evidence, however trivial or questionable, to implicate HPB, he ignored all evidence that could be used in her favor. His report is riddled with slanted statements, conjecture advanced as fact or probable fact, uncorroborated testimony of unnamed witnesses, selection of evidence and downright falsity." Harrison does not address whether there was any real phenomenon.

He concluded that Hodgson's case against Blavatsky was not proven, and that there is no evidence that the Mahatma Letters were written by her. However, the Hodgson report did not just deal with forgery, but addressed the crude psychic tricks used by Blavatsky such as her séances where spirits respond to her with "raps" on the table, the dropping of Mahatma Letters from the ceiling and onto peoples heads, and various letters written by Blavatsky incriminating herself, and the actions of Theosophists to cover up the fraud.

Harrison criticizes Hodgson for failing to conduct himself as if he were in a court of law. However, Hogdson was not in a court of law, but was a parapsychologist sent to India and reporting back to the Society of Psychical Research. It is likely Hodgson had hoped to find the phenomena true. Harrison does not address the evidence that Blavatsky was simply another fraudulent medium using "spirit rapping" such as that uncovered by the Seybert Commission in 1887. The investigations of mediums in the late 1880s dealt a blow to spiritualists worldwide.

Harrison believes that the Hodgson Report "matters a great deal" since it "is still accepted by many compilers of encyclopedias and dictionaries as the last word on" Blavatsky. Harrison does not "claim to demonstrate from an analysis of [...] Blavatsky's 'ordinary' writing that she could not have been responsible for the" letters attributed to Koot Hoomi.

The Madras Christian College magazine made a similar analysis of fraud on the part of Blavatsky, and addresses Blavatsky's ruses because the Madras Christian College had previously written positively concerning Blavatsky.

See also 
 Coulomb Affair
 Incidents in the Life of Madame Blavatsky

References

Further reading 
 Transcribed from 
 Transcribed from 

 Hastings, Beatrice: Defence of Madame Blavatsky (Band 2). The Hastings press, Worthington 1937
 Transcribed from 

 Kingsland, William: The real H. P. Blavatsky, a study in theosophy and a memoir of a great soul. J.M. Watkins, London 1928

 Vania, K. F.: Madame H. P. Blavatsky, her occult phenomena and the society for physical research. Sat Publishing Co., Bombay 1951
 Transcribed in

External links 

 Reported in 

Helena Blavatsky
Theosophy